Marco Ballini (born 12 June 1998) is a professional footballer who plays as a centre back for Thai League 1 club Chiangrai United. Born in Italy, he has represented Thailand at youth level.

Personal life
Ballini was born in Bologna to an Italian father and a Thai mother from Udon Thani.

Honours

International
Thailand U-23
 AFF U-22 Youth Championship runner-up: 2019

References

1998 births
Living people
Footballers from Bologna
Italian people of Thai descent
Marco Ballini
Italian footballers
Marco Ballini
Association football defenders
Alfonsine FC 1921 players
Marco Ballini
Marco Ballini
Marco Ballini
Serie D players
Marco Ballini
Italian expatriate footballers
Italian expatriate sportspeople in Thailand
Expatriate footballers in Thailand
Marco Ballini
Thai expatriate sportspeople in Italy